The 2021 Volta a Catalunya was a road cycling stage race that took place between 22 and 28 March 2021 in Spain. It was the 100th edition of the Volta a Catalunya and the seventh race of the 2021 UCI World Tour.

Teams
All nineteen UCI WorldTeams were joined by five UCI ProTeams to make up the twenty-four teams that participated in the race. Each team entered seven riders for a total of 168 riders, of which 131 finished.  was initially scheduled to participate, but they withdrew before the start of the race after three staff members tested positive for COVID-19.  withdrew before the start of stage 5 after two staff members tested positive for COVID-19.

UCI WorldTeams

 
 
 
 
 
 
 
 
 
 
 
 
 
 
 
 
 
 
 

UCI ProTeams

Route

Stages

Stage 1
22 March 2021 — Calella to Calella,

Stage 2
23 March 2021 — Pla de l'Estany (Banyoles) to Pla de l'Estany (Banyoles),  (ITT)

Stage 3
24 March 2021 — Canal Olímpic de Catalunya to Vallter 2000,

Stage 4
25 March 2021 — Ripoll to Port Ainé (Pallars Sobirà),

Stage 5
26 March 2021 — La Pobla de Segur to Manresa,

Stage 6
27 March 2021 — Tarragona to Mataró,

Stage 7
28 March 2021 — Barcelona to Barcelona,

Classification leadership table

 On stage 2, Natnael Berhane, who was second in the sprints classification, wore the blue-striped jersey, because first-placed Andreas Kron wore the green-striped jersey as the leader of the general classification. For the same reason, Rémy Rochas, who was second in the young rider classification, wore the orange-striped jersey.
 On stage 3, Brandon McNulty, who was second in the young rider classification, wore the orange-striped jersey, because first-placed João Almeida wore the green-striped jersey as the leader of the general classification.
 On stage 4, Rohan Dennis, who was second in the sprints classification, wore the blue-striped jersey, because first-placed Adam Yates wore the green-striped jersey as the leader of the general classification. For the same reason, Esteban Chaves, who was second in the mountains classification, wore the red-striped jersey.
 On stages 5–7, Koen Bouwman, who was third in the mountains classification, wore the red-striped jersey, because first-placed Esteban Chaves wore the blue-striped jersey as the leader of the points classification, and second-placed Adam Yates wore the green-striped jersey as the leader of the general classification.

Final classification standings

General classification

Points classification

Mountains classification

Young rider classification

Team classification

References

2021
Volta a Catalunya
Volta a Catalunya
Volta a Catalunya